William Landsborough (21 February 1825 – 16 March 1886) was an explorer of Australia and notably he was the first explorer to complete a North-to-South crossing of Australia. He was a member of the Queensland Legislative Council.

Early life
Landsborough was born in Stevenston, Ayrshire, Scotland, the son of Rev Dr David Landsborough (a clergyman, entomologist and artist) and his wife Margaret, née McLeish. William Landsborough was educated in Irvine and migrated to Australia in 1842, several years after his brothers James and John.

Early life in Australia
William Landsborough arrived in Sydney on the Duke of Richmond, on 30 September 1842. He joined his brothers James and John on their property in the New England district of New South Wales and stayed with them until 1850 when he went into partnership with a friend, William Penson, buying 30,000 acres nearby which they named Oak Ridge.

When gold was discovered in Bathurst, New South Wales in 1851, he went to the diggings but had little success. In 1853 Landsborough decided to give up mining and rejoin his brothers, who had sold up their property and had driven their stock before them, to try their luck in the unsettled districts north of Brisbane. Landsborough sold his share in Oak Ridge to his partner, William Penson, and in 1853 took ship to Brisbane.

When Landsborough arrived he learned that his brothers had taken up land at Tenningering, about fifty miles south-west of today's city of Bundaberg. He joined them there for a while before in 1854 taking up land for himself a little further north in the Kolan River area.

At that time, this was the most northerly coastal settlement along the eastern seaboard of Australia and it was here that Landsborough began his career as an explorer. Between 1856 and 1861, each year when the shearing season was over, he explored north and west, each time deeper into unknown territory. He preferred to travel in a small group usually with one or two friends and an Aboriginal tracker. As Thomas Welsby later wrote, "A sequel to Landsborough’s expeditions was the race for the magnificent, pastoral country described by him." 
 
In 1856 he explored north through present-day Gladstone to Broad Sound, Mt Pisgah and Mt Fort Cooper. He took up a selection of land at Fort Cooper soon after this.

In 1857 he explored the area where the town of Rockhampton now stands and to the north once more to Broad Sound. It was in this area that he took up some more land, which became his favourite property, Glen Prairie.

In 1858 he travelled west from Rockhampton to the Comet River, naming also Springsure Creek and Orion Creek. He sold his Kolan River land at this time to finance the development of his Fort Cooper and Glen Prairie holdings.

In 1859 he travelled north-west from Glen Prairie to the Leichhardt Range and the Burdekin and Cape rivers.

In 1860, in his longest and toughest journey of exploration, he travelled with Nat Buchanan due west from Glen Prairie and came across the rich pastures on the traditional tribal lands of the Iningai, which he renamed Bowen Downs,  after the Queensland Governor, Sir George Bowen. He also gave English names to Towerhill Creek, Cornish Creek and Aramac Creek.

In 1860 the Bowen Downs was opened for settlement and Landsborough and Buchanan applied for and were granted a lease of land there, which became known as Bowen Downs Station. By 1860, at the age of 35 years, Landsborough now owned or part-owned over 1 million acres of land.

To finance the stocking of the station Landsborough and Buchanan formed a partnership, the Landsborough River Company, with Robert Morehead and Matthew Young, of the Scottish Australian Investment Company, and Edward Cornish, a friend of Landsborough. The Bowen Downs Station was established in 1862, with Nat Buchanan as the first manager of the property.

The search for Burke and Wills
As a result of his excellent reputation as a bushman and explorer, in August 1861 he was placed in charge of one of the four parties sent out to search for the lost explorers, Burke and Wills. His party was to commence their search from the Gulf of Carpentaria. They set sail on the brig Firefly escorted by the naval steamship HMCSS Victoria from Brisbane in late August 1861. During the voyage around to the Gulf, Landsborough's team survived shipwreck and mutiny on one of the Great Barrier Reef islands.

On 1 October the party of four whites and four aborigines arrived by ship at the mouth of the Albert River at the site of current Burketown. Landsborough's party of five men started their first search for Burke and Wills on 16 November 1862, travelling south-west in the direction of Central Mount Stuart. He discovered and traced the Gregory River to its source, then skirted the Barkly Tableland and found an inland river flowing south, which he named the Herbert, but was later renamed the Georgina River. Little water could be found and no trace of Burke and Wills and, deciding not to continue he turned north again, arriving back at the depot at the Albert River on 19 January 1862.

On 10 February he commenced another exploration in search of Burke and Wills first of all travelling east to the Flinders River, where the other Queensland search party, headed by Frederick Walker had found tracks of Burke and Wills. They followed the tracks south but soon lost them. He continued on southward searching for the lost explorers and in the middle of March, following the Flinders River, but finding he was getting too far to the east, turned south to the Thomson River and then the Barcoo River. Stores began to run short and had Landsborough known that Howitt had left reserve stores at Burke's depot on Cooper Creek he would have made for it. Being unaware of this, he kept travelling south and on 21 May arrived at the then northernmost settlement of central Australia, Messrs Williams' Coongoola station, 50 km south of present-day Wyandra and about 800 miles north of Melbourne. It was here that they were told of the fate of Burke and Wills. Obtaining provisions the party set out for the Darling River some 200 miles distant, arriving at Bunnawannah Station on the Darling near Bourke on 2 June. They stayed at Bunnawannah for several weeks, awaiting instructions from John Macadam, secretary of the Exploration Committee in Melbourne, then made their way along the Darling River to Menindee and then to Melbourne. On arrival his party were fêted for their accomplishments. Landsborough and his party had become the first people to cross Australia from north to south.

On 30 September 1862 a public meeting was held in at the Exhibition Building in Melbourne in honour of Landsborough and John McKinlay, who had led the South Australian party in search of Burke and Wills and in doing so had, himself, crossed the entire continent, south to north. In November, Sir Henry Barkly, Governor of Victoria presented Landsborough with a silver dinner service engraved with the Landsborough crest.

Landsborough married Caroline Hollingsworth Raine in Sydney on 30 December 1862, and early in 1863 they travelled to England via India. There he was accorded the honour of being received by Queen Victoria. The Royal Geographical Society also presented him with a gold watch for finding a practicable route from the north to the south of Australia.

Later life

William and Caroline Landsborough returned to Australia in late 1864 to discover that while they were away their property in Broad Sound, Glen Prairie, had been sold under mysterious circumstances. The Landsborough River Company was also experiencing financial difficulties. In 1869 after years of drought and with facing increasing debt, Landsborough finally handed over his shareholdings in the company to Morehead and Young.

Landsborough was made a Life Member of the Queensland Legislative Council in 1865 but served for only one session. Looking for employment, towards the end of 1865 he was appointed Commissioner of Crown Lands, Police Magistrate and Sub Collector of Customs for the district of Burke in the Gulf country. Finding the township of Burketown riddled with fever, he made Sweers Island in the Gulf of Carpentaria his headquarters. His wife and two children joined him soon afterwards, living on Sweers Island, and from there he did much local exploring.

Landsborough and his wife Caroline had a third child while living at Sweers Island, whom they named Sweersena. Caroline died of tuberculosis in Sydney in 1869.

In September 1870, Landsborough returned to Brisbane. In June 1872, he was made Inspector of Brands for the Moreton district and held this position for the remainder of his life.

In 1873 William married Maria Theresa Carr, a widow with two sons. Together they had another three sons.

In 1882, the Queensland parliament voted Landsborough £2000 for his services as an explorer, and with this he purchased a pastoral property near present-day Caloundra which he named Loch Lamerough. He died and was buried there in March 1886. On 13 June 1913, his widow had him reburied at Toowong Cemetery in Brisbane.

Legacy
William Landsborough was in the vanguard of exploration in northern and eastern Queensland in the middle of the 19th century, his explorations resulting in the opening up of vast areas of northern and north-eastern Australia to settlement. As a result, there are numerous places named after William Landsborough, including:
 County of Landsborough, New South Wales
 County of Landsborough, Queensland in Shire of Cloncurry 
 Town of Landsborough in Sunshine Coast Region
 Town and parish of Landsborough, Victoria 
 Parish of Landsborough in Flinders Shire 
 Landsborough Highway, stretching between Morven and Cloncurry
as well as a number of streets, creeks and mountains in Australia and also in New Zealand.

The William Landsborough Diaries (1856-1886), held by the State Library of Queensland were ranked #39 in the ‘Top 150: Documenting Queensland’ exhibition when it toured to venues around Queensland from February 2009 to April 2010.  The exhibition was part of Queensland State Archives’ events and exhibition program which contributed to the state's Q150 celebrations, marking the 150th anniversary of the separation of Queensland from New South Wales.

In 1957 a Memorial stone was erected in the Nebo Shire to honour William Landsborough.

A number of heritage-listed sites are associated with William Landsborough's explorations, including:
 Burketown, Queensland: Landsborough Tree
 Mitchell Highway, Charleville, Queensland: Landsborough's Blazed Tree (Camp 67)
 29 km south of Charleville off the Mitchell Highway near Bakers Bend: Landsborough's Blazed Tree (Camp 69)

References

External links
 
 
 William Landsborough's grave, Toowong, Queensland, 1935 National Library of Australia
 Burial stone for William Landsborough, Caloundra Bonzle.com - Bonzle Digital Atlas of Australia
The letters of Caroline Landsborough. Trisha Fielding, John Oxley Library Blog, State Library of Queensland.
 
 

1886 deaths
Explorers of Australia
Explorers of Queensland
1825 births
Burials at Toowong Cemetery
Members of the Queensland Legislative Council
19th-century Australian politicians
Pre-Separation Queensland
Scottish emigrants to colonial Australia
19th-century Australian public servants
Australian pastoralists
19th-century Australian businesspeople